Olivier de la Marche (1425–1502) was a courtier, soldier, chronicler and poet in the last decades of the independent Duchy of Burgundy.  He was close to Charles the Bold, and after his death held the important position of maître d'hotel to his daughter Mary of Burgundy, and her husband, and was sent on a mission as ambassador to France.

He saw at close hand the dispute over Flanders between the kingdom of France and the dynasty of the Habsburgs after Charles' death. The area then held a central place in the Empire over which Charles V and his successors wanted hegemony.

His best-known work is his memoirs, which were published in 1562.

References

External links
 
 

1425 births
1502 deaths
Duchy of Burgundy
15th-century French writers
French male writers
French memoirists